Sanggeng Stadium is a multi-purpose stadium in Manokwari, Indonesia.  It is currently used mostly for football matches and is used as the home venue for Perseman Manokwari.  The stadium holds 10,000 people.

In 2022, the stadium was renovated for its use in anniversary celebrations for the Republic of Indonesia.

References

Multi-purpose stadiums in Indonesia
Manokwari
Buildings and structures in West Papua (province)
Football venues in Indonesia
Sports venues in Indonesia